Alaa Gatea (born 3 May 1987) is an Iraqi football goalkeeper playing for Amanat Baghdad.

Honours

Club
Al-Zawraa
Iraqi Premier League: 2015–16, 2017–18
Iraq FA Cup: 2016–17, 2018–19
Iraqi Super Cup: 2017, 2021

External links

Iraqi footballers
Iraq international footballers
Living people
1987 births
Association football goalkeepers